Akurio, also known as Akuriyó, is an endangered Cariban language that was used by the Akurio people in Suriname until the late 20th century, when the group began using the Trío language. Akuriyo does not have a writing system.

Status
The last native speaker is believed to have died in the first decade of the 2000s, at which time only 10 people were estimated to have Akuriyó as a second language. By 2012, only two semi-speakers remained.

Sepi Akuriyó, one of the last surviving speakers of Akuriyó, went missing 2 December 2018, when a small plane carrying 8 people disappeared during a flight over the Amazon rainforest. A search and rescue operation was called off after two weeks.

References

Languages of Suriname
Cariban languages
Endangered indigenous languages of the Americas